Canada competed at the 1936 Summer Olympics in Berlin, Germany. 97 competitors, 79 men and 18 women, took part in 69 events in 12 sports.

In preparation for the Olympics, Canadian Olympic Committee secretary-treasurer Fred Marples urged for branches of the Amateur Athletic Union of Canada (AAU of C) to raise funds to make the Canadian Olympic team as large as it could be. He stated that the Government of Canada would contribute C$10,000 towards the national team, and that the Olympic Committee sought to maximize profits from the 1936 Canadian Track and Field Championships to provide additional funding for the Olympic team.

AAU of C president W. A. Fry self-published a book covering Canadian achievements at the 1936 Winter Olympics and 1936 Summer Olympics. His 1936 book, Canada at eleventh Olympiad 1936 in Germany : Garmisch-Partenkirchen, February 6th to 13th, Berlin, August 1st to 16th, was printed by the Dunnville Chronicle presses and subtitled an official report of the Canadian Olympic Committee. He wrote that Canadians did very well at the 1936 Olympic games despite having one-tenth of the population of other countries. He opined that the length of the Canadian winter negatively affected summer training, and that Canadian athletes were underfunded compared to other countries.

Medalists

Gold
 Frank Amyot – Canoeing, men's C-1 1000m

Silver
 Gordon Aitchison, Ian Allison, Arthur Chapman, Chuck Chapman, Edward Dawson, Irving Meretsky, Stanley Nantais, James Stewart, Malcolm Wiseman, Doug Peden – Basketball, men's team competition
 John Loaring – Athletics, men's 400m hurdles
 Frank Saker and Harvey Charters – Canoeing, men's C-2 10000m

Bronze
 Dorothy Brookshaw, Mildred Dolson, Hilda Cameron, Aileen Meagher – Athletics, women's 4 × 100 m relay
 Elizabeth Taylor – Athletics, women's 80m hurdles
 Phil Edwards —Athletics, men's 800 metres
 Frank Saker and Harvey Charters – Canoeing, men's C-2 1000m
 Joseph Schleimer – Wrestling, men's freestyle welterweight (66–72 kg)

Athletics

Basketball

Boxing

Canoeing

Cycling

Six cyclists, all male, represented Canada in 1936.

Individual road race
Lionel Coleman
George Crompton
Rusty Peden
George Turner

Team road race
Lionel Coleman
George Crompton
Rusty Peden
George Turner

Sprint
Doug Peace

Time trial
Bob McLeod

Team pursuit
Lionel Coleman
George Crompton
Bob McLeod
George Turner

Diving

Fencing

Eight fencers, five men and three women, represented Canada in 1936.

Men's foil
 Charles Otis
 Ernest Dalton
 Don Collinge

Men's team foil
 Bertrand Boissonnault, Don Collinge, George Tully, Charles Otis, Ernest Dalton

Men's épée
 George Tully
 Ernest Dalton
 Bertrand Boissonnault

Men's team épée
 Don Collinge, Ernest Dalton, Charles Otis, George Tully

Men's sabre
 George Tully
 Don Collinge
 Charles Otis

Men's team sabre
 Ernest Dalton, Charles Otis, George Tully, Don Collinge

Women's foil
 Aileen Thomas
 Nancy Archibald
 Kathleen Hughes-Hallett

Rowing

Canada had ten rowers participate in two out of seven rowing events in 1936.

 Men's single sculls
 Charles Campbell

 Men's eight
 Cedric Liddell
 Grey McLeish
 Joseph Harris
 Ben Sharpe
 Jack Cunningham
 Charles Matteson
 Harry Fry
 Sandy Saunders
 Les MacDonald (cox)

Sailing

Swimming

Wrestling

Art competitions

References

Nations at the 1936 Summer Olympics
1936
Summer Olympics